Madge Carr Cook (1856–1933) was an English-born American stage actress.

Biography
She was most famous for creating the title role in the 1904 Broadway play Mrs. Wiggs of the Cabbage Patch. She was also famous as the mother of actress Eleanor Robson Belmont, a leading star of Broadway who retired from the stage after marrying into the wealthy Belmont family. Eleanor lived to be 100 years old.

Cook was married twice, to Charles Robson who disappeared or deserted her in 1880 and to Augustus Cook whom she married in 1891 and who sued her for annulment of their marriage.

References

External links

portrait gallery(NY Public Library)

1856 births
1933 deaths
Actresses from Yorkshire
English stage actresses